Eudocima cajeta is a moth of the family Erebidae first described by Pieter Cramer in 1775. It is found in Sri Lanka, India and Indonesia.

References

Eudocima
Moths described in 1775
Taxa named by Pieter Cramer